Wellington County may refer to:
 Wellington County, New South Wales, Australia
 Wellington Land District, Tasmania, Australia 
 Wellington County, Western Australia, Australia
 Wellington County, Ontario, Canada

County name disambiguation pages